Khuga Dam impounds the Khuga River south of Churachandpur town (Manipur), India. The multipurpose project supplies electricity and water. It was started in 1983 and resumed in 2002 after being at a standstill for a period of time. The work is nearing its completion and the structure was scheduled to be commissioned during 2007. On
12 November 2010 Sonia Gandhi inaugurated the dam and dedicated it to the nation.

Description

 Height:        38 meters
 Width:         230 meters
 Cost estimate: INR 2.5 billion

Implementing companies:
 NPCC for earthen dam, spillways and canal
 R M Sinha & Co for power house and water supply

Present Status:
 Although the project has been inaugurated in 2010 by Smt. Sonia Gandhi, the irrigation canal is functional up to a few kilometres downstream, and the remaining part remains dry. 
 The proposed hydroelectricity generation from the project never materialise. As of today not a single unit of electricity is generated from the dam. Paradoxically, no power house for generating electricity existed till today i.e. 17 March 2021 and may never be.

References 

 "Khuga completion still a long way off",  The Imphal Free Press 1 May 2006
 "CM looks to June for Khuga dam completion", The Sangai Express 21 April 2007
 "Khuga Dam photo gallery" http://www.kanglaonline.com/index.php?template=gallery_popup&gid=144
 "R.M Sinha & Co" http://www.rmsinha.com
 "Aerial view of Khuga dam" http://wikimapia.org/1445648/
 "Khuga Head Works Division, IFCD Deptt. Manipur Khuga Multipurpose Project, Khuga Canal Divn No. II" https://web.archive.org/web/20071006170726/http://ccpur.nic.in/IFCD_khuga.htm

Churachandpur
Hydroelectric power stations in Manipur
Dams in Manipur
2010 establishments in Manipur
Dams completed in 2010